Ioannis Masmanidis (born 9 March 1983) is a Greek-German footballer who plays for VfL Wolfsburg II.

Club career 
He moved to Arminia Bielefeld during the winter transfer period 2005–06 from Karlsruher SC. He usually plays on the left side of attack or midfield. He also played for the German U-21 national team.

In July 2008, he moved to 1. FC Nürnberg, after six months he left the club and moved to Apollon Limassol on 6 January 2009. He left Apollon Limassol in summer 2010 and signed for Greek side Ethnikos Piraeus F.C. Masmanidis played in the first half of the 2010–11 season six games in the Beta Ethniki for Ethnikos and returned in January 2011 to his homeland Germany when he signed for SV Wehen Wiesbaden.

In the summer of 2011, he joined Belgian Second Division side K.A.S. Eupen on a free transfer. After a year he moved on to fellow leaguer Visé, where he stayed another two years.

In August 2014, he returned to Germany and signed for VfL Wolfsburg II of fourth tier Regionalliga Nord on a one-year deal.

National team 
He represented the German under-20 team at the 2003 FIFA World Youth Championship and the under-21 team at European under-21 championship 2006.

References

External links 
 

1983 births
Living people
German footballers
German people of Greek descent
Bayer 04 Leverkusen players
Bayer 04 Leverkusen II players
Karlsruher SC players
Arminia Bielefeld players
1. FC Nürnberg players
Apollon Limassol FC players
K.A.S. Eupen players
C.S. Visé players
VfL Wolfsburg II players
Germany under-21 international footballers
Germany youth international footballers
Bundesliga players
2. Bundesliga players
3. Liga players
Challenger Pro League players
Cypriot First Division players
Expatriate footballers in Cyprus
Expatriate footballers in Belgium
Association football midfielders
Sportspeople from Leverkusen
Footballers from North Rhine-Westphalia